The Allegheny City Stables, located at 840 W North Avenue in the Central North Side neighborhood of Pittsburgh, Pennsylvania, was built in 1895.

History and architectural features
Robert Swan and Samuel Hastings constructed this 18,000-square-foot, three-story brick warehouse in Romanesque style. Noteworthy architectural details include parapets, brick diapering, and round-headed and segmental arched windows. The structure is significant for its association with the former City of Allegheny, having served as a public works and stables building. It housed the Department of Public Works and other offices on the first story, municipal and neighborhood horses on the second, and the resources for the horses on the third.

 Being the last surviving civic structure built by the government of Allegheny City, Allegheny City Stables began a neighborhood campaign led by the Allegheny West Civic Council, to save the old stables from demolition. The campaign was successful, and the stables building was added to the List of City of Pittsburgh historic designations on July 7, 2007. Still, the building remained vacant for over a decade.

From 2019 to 2021, Birgo, a North Side based real estate developer and property management company, restored the abandoned Allegheny City Stables. As of September 2019, the building was under renovation as loft apartments, which encompassed the renovated stable building accompanied by 32,000 square feet of new addition. The new development was constructed on the adjacent lot to the west side of the Stables building as an addition to the existing building, seamlessly connected in the interior.

The new combined complex is called Allegheny City Stables Lofts, a residential community honoring the historical relevance of the Stables while adapting for a new purpose. The complex will include 36 units with a combination of studio, 1-bedroom, and 2-bedroom units. Rental rates are slated to be between $1,500 and $2,500 per month. Communal amenities will include a fitness center, guest suite, lounge, indoor parking spaces and a lobby that “tells the story and pays tribute to the history of the neighborhood,” according to a media release.

References

Government buildings in Pittsburgh
History of Pittsburgh
Infrastructure completed in 1895
1895 establishments in Pennsylvania